Harand Camp of the Theatre Arts is a performing arts summer camp located at Carthage College in Kenosha, Wisconsin and based in Evanston, Illinois.

Camp Overview
Established in 1955, Harand Camp of the Theatre Arts was one of the nation's first camps to combine singing, dancing and acting with the fun of traditional Summer camp. Campers (coed, ages 7–17) take part in a non-competitive musical theater program, as well as sports and activities. Harand Camp is accredited by the American Camp Association and boasts a camper to staff ratio of 4:1.  Campers register for 1, 3 or 6 week overnight sessions.

Facilities: 400-seat theatre, dormitories overlooking Lake Michigan, Olympic-size indoor swimming pool, dance studio, athletic center, air conditioned classrooms, food by Sodexo

Schedule: Campers spend half the day in theatre classes and the other half in activity classes of their own choosing. Evenings and Sundays include a rotating schedule of rehearsals, cabin nights, and all-camp events and games.

Camp Living: Campers (ages 7–17) are divided into "cabins" by age and reside together in dorms (2-3 per room). Cabin groups are generally named for famous musicals or movies such as Brigadoon. While the names have fluctuated over the years, for example "Dream Girls" replacing "Cinderella", this chart provides an example from past years:

Theatre Program
Harand Camp adheres to a non-competitive philosophy where everyone is a star (the primary goal is for all campers to build self-confidence & self-esteem). In preparation for final performances, campers take daily classes in singing, dancing, and dramatics in the morning or afternoon. Occasional rehearsals are held in the evening (alternating with activities & events).  Each session then culminates with a large-scale performance for friends, family, and alumni in a state-of-the-art theatre.

One Week Session (Workshop) - Campers can get a taste of the Harand experience with a newly created one-week program. These campers enjoy the same arts and recreation activities as the first three-week session campers, culminating in a Workshop performance featuring selections from that session's Pageant (see below). This option is perfect for children who have never been away from home and want to try camp without committing to a full three weeks (though they do have the option to stay for the full session).

First 3-Week Session (Pageant) - Campers participate in a full-length musical revue involving the entire camp. Each age group prepares two sections of non-stop singing and dancing and appear on stage no less than three times. Past Harand Camp pageants include: Tributes to Irving Berlin, George Gershwin, Movie Musicals, Women of Broadway, the Tony Awards, Broadway Rock Musicals, etc.

Second 3-Week Session (Shows) - During the second three weeks, each age group prepares a full-length show. Unlike at other camps, Haranders have the chance to take on leading roles, as well as learn how to be a part of the ensemble – ensuring that every camper receives the full musical theatre experience.

Electives & Activities
In addition to the theatre program, campers also register for three periods of elective activities per day.  The camp operates on an alternating schedule of A-Days (M, W, F) and B-Days (Tu, Th, Sa), so campers actually have six classes of their own choosing.  Examples may include Soccer, Basketball, Swimming, Volleyball, Badminton, Cheerleading, Tennis, Fitness, Zumba, Technical Theatre, Costuming, Improv, Audition Coaching, Story Theatre, Hip Hop, Tap, Photography, Film & Video, Arts & Crafts, Creative Writing, Board Games, etc.

When not rehearsing in the evening, campers enjoy cabin nights and events, as well as all-camp competitions, concerts and excursions. The activity schedule may include the following: talent shows, campfires, Action Territory (entertainment park), beach excursions, skating, Family Feud and Trivia competitions, hobby nights, carnivals, dances, karaoke, bowling, and more.

History
First established in 1955, Harand Camp's unique method of teaching has helped thousands develop poise and confidence in an "all-star, no-star" environment.  Harand came into being as a children's arts studio based in Chicago and area suburbs. Founders Sulie and Pearl Harand—already well known for their mastery of the performing arts disciplines—opened the studio as a way to share these unique talents with a younger generation.  Pearl, a former member of the Chicago Repertory Theatre, taught dramatics, while Sulie, known for her incomparable one-woman interpretations of classic musicals, taught voice.  Other staff included Sulie's husband Byron as Business Manager; Nora Jacobs, who had trained alongside Martha Graham, taught dance; and Byrne and Joyce Piven, future founders of the Piven Theatre Workshop, helped with the acting program.  Staff would soon also include Errol Pearlman on piano, Estelle Spector (now head of the Columbia College Musical Theater program) as choreographer, and future Cultural Commissioner, Lois Weisberg, in drama.

The studio curriculum focused primarily on musical theater with an emphasis on the community spirit and equal opportunity for which the camp would later become known. The studio was also the first to combine training in all three musical theater disciplines – singing, dancing, and acting. The children loved it so much that they never wanted to go home so many parents suggested expanding the program to a full camp in the summer months. Pearl once told the Chicago Reader that the "dream [had] always been to have a place where kids can laugh and play, where they can develop their whole personality while learning through shared experiences." That dream became a reality when a resort in Elkhart Lake, Wisconsin became available.

Led by Sulie and Pearl, along with husbands Byron and Sam, Harand Camp of the Theatre Arts opened its doors in the summer of 1955 with a staff composed primarily of the studio team and 87 campers—a number that grew to over 250 in just three years. The buildings were renamed after popular shows with the theatre deemed "Carnegie Hall" after the famed venue in New York. Campers were split into groups designated by show names such as Brigadoon (a tradition that continues today) and became known as "Haranders."

The camp curriculum struck a balance between teachings in the performing arts and more traditional camp activities such as tennis, arts and crafts, and swimming. Jeremy Piven, who was a camper in the 1980s, still marvels at the program telling the Chicago Reader "how many places in the world can you go to as a kid and get fulfillment performing in plays without all the politics—and still get to play sports all day long?"

Harand has also been able to set itself apart from other arts camps by adhering to a philosophy of inclusion and a non-competitive spirit - placing a premium on social development and holding firm to its commitment to sharing lead roles and the message of "No Man Is an Island."  Sulie has said that they have always wanted "to give children the ability to live with other people and not feel someone else has to fail for them to succeed."  This philosophy has generated avid support from prominent alumni such as Lois Weisberg, Commissioner of the Chicago Department of Cultural Affairs, who has said that "the Harands' approach should be reinvented today in the public schools. Their model is an extraordinary model for teaching."

In 1989 the Harand family sold the camp property in Elkhart Lake; however, the camp continued to live on and moved to Wayland Academy, a preparatory school in Beaver Dam, Wisconsin.  Though the property was rented and there were no buildings or beaches to call their own, the traditions and philosophy remained.  In 2005 the camp relocated to Carthage College in Kenosha proving, once again that, when it comes to Harand "home is where the heart is."

Harand Academy
In 2013 the Harand Academy of the Arts was launched as a separate non-profit, offering performing arts classes and shows at Starland in Deerfield, IL.  The academy is inspired by the original Harand Studios of the Theatre Arts started by Sulie and Pearl Harand in the 1950s in Downtown Chicago.

Notable alumni
 Richard Berman, Film Producer - Grumpy Old Men (film)
 Bruce Block, Film Producer - What Women Want
 Billy Campbell, Actor The Killing (U.S. TV series), The 4400, Once & Again
 Justin "Nobunny" Champlin, Masked punk rocker "Love Visions (Album)", "Raw Romance (Album)", "First Blood (Album)"
 Ben Cohen, Broadway stage actor, Gypsy: A Musical Fable
 Andy Davis, Golden Globe nominated film director, producer and cinematographer, The Fugitive (film), Holes (film)
 Russ Feingold, Former U.S. Senator from Wisconsin
 Jessie Fisher, Jeff Award-Winning Actress
 Sean Healy- National Concert Promoter
 Aaron Himelstein, actor
 Brad Holcman, Television Development Executive, FOX21 and A&E Average Joe contestant
 Laura Lippman, author ("Tess Monaghan" mystery series)
 Lissie, American folk rock artist and Paste Magazine's #1 best new solo artist of 2010
 Todd London, playwright and artistic director of New Dramatists
 Virginia Madsen, Oscar nominated Actress, Sideways
 Elyse Mueller, actress and model
 Deborah Robins, folksinger and recording artist 2016 solo CD "Lone Journey"
 Jeremy Piven, Emmy Award winning actor, Entourage
 Duane Schuler, lighting designer, Lyric Opera, Metropolitan Opera
 TJ Shanoff, radio personality and musical director at The Second City
 Erin Slattery, Costume designer, Emmy Award winner for costume on Sesame Street.
 David Brian Stuart,  Founder/Executive Producer; Improv Playhouse Theater, Director, SAG-AFTRA Actor, former staff of The Players Workshop, mentored by Josephine Forsberg
 Lois Weisberg, Former Commissioner of the Chicago Department of Cultural Affairs
 Albert "Bill" Williams - Theater Critic (Chicago Reader)
 Jessica Poter, writer, Hot in Cleveland, Blackish
James Yule, an all around (mostly) swell chap.
 Billy Zane, actor, Dead Calm (film), The Phantom and Titanic. 
 John Zuiker, Jeff Award-Winning Scenic Designer
 Adriana DeGirolami, actor

Alumni Quotes
"Harand is like living the dream for me…how many places in the world can you go as a kid and get fulfillment performing in plays… and still get to play sports all day long…I will never forget that magical place." – Jeremy Piven, Emmy Award winning actor

"[Harand Camp] made a tremendous contribution to arts education. The Harand’s approach should be reinvented today in the public schools. Their model is an extraordinary model for teaching." – Lois Weisberg, Former Commissioner of the Chicago Department of Cultural Affairs

"Harand was home and the most important formative place I’ve ever been." – Todd London, playwright and artistic director of New Dramatists

"Harand is one of the most influential cultural-education institutions in the country…As a critic and teacher, I am indebted to Harand for teaching me to look for the unique qualities each individual brings to a role onstage or a task in real life." – Albert Williams, Theater Critic & Professor at Columbia College Chicago

"Harand was all about theater and music but even for someone like me who didn’t have any talent, it was a magical place.  People I met at Harand were among my biggest influences growing up.  A few became lifelong friends." – Jacob Weisberg, Washington Post

News Articles
 WGN Radio Interview with Co-Director Janice Gaffin
 Chicago Reader - "Sister Act"
 Oy!Chicago - "There's No Place Like Summer Camp"
 Madison Magazine - "Hip-hip Harand!"
 NWI Times - "All The World's A Stage"
 Chicago Tribune - "Theater Camp Founder..."
 Chicago Reader - "Harand Camp at 55"
 Broadway World - Harand Academy to Launch at Starland in Deerfield

References

External links
 The Official Harand Camp Website
 The Official Harand Academy of the Arts Website

Summer camps in Wisconsin
Carthage College
1954 establishments in Wisconsin
Evanston, Illinois